The men's parallel bars competition was one of eight events for male competitors in artistic gymnastics at the 1972 Summer Olympics in Munich. The qualification and final rounds took place on August 27, 29 and September 1 at the Olympiahalle. There were 112 competitors from 26 nations (with 1 of the 113 gymnasts not starting in this apparatus); nations entering the team event had 6 gymnasts while other nations could have up to 3 gymnasts. Japan reached the height of its success in the event this year: putting four men into the six-man final and sweeping the medals. Sawao Kato earned Japan's third consecutive gold medal in the parallel bars, tying Switzerland for most golds all-time; Kato would break that tie in 1976 with his second (and Japan's fourth) gold medal. Shigeru Kasamatsu took silver while Eizo Kenmotsu earned bronze.

Background

This was the 13th appearance of the event, which is one of the five apparatus events held every time there were apparatus events at the Summer Olympics (no apparatus events were held in 1900, 1908, 1912, or 1920). Four of the six finalists from 1968 returned: gold medalist Akinori Nakayama of Japan, silver medalist Mikhail Voronin of the Soviet Union, bronze medalist Viktor Klimenko of the Soviet Union, and fifth-place finisher Eizo Kenmotsu of Japan. Nakayama had also won the 1970 world championship, with Voronin and Kenmotsu tied for second.

Liechtenstein, New Zealand, and North Korea each made their debut in the men's parallel bars. The United States made its 12th appearance, most of any nation, having missed only the inaugural 1896 Games.

Competition format

Each nation entered a team of six gymnasts or up to three individual gymnasts. All entrants in the gymnastics competitions performed both a compulsory exercise and a voluntary exercise for each apparatus. The scores for all 12 exercises were summed to give an individual all-around score. (One gymnast who entered the all-around competition did not perform on the vault.) These exercise scores were also used for qualification for the apparatus finals. The two exercises (compulsory and voluntary) for each apparatus were summed to give an apparatus score; the top 6 in each apparatus participated in the finals; others were ranked 7th through 111th. Half of the scores from the preliminary carried over to the final.

Schedule

All times are Central European Time (UTC+1)

Results

One-hundred twelve gymnasts competed in the compulsory and optional rounds on August 27 and 29. The six highest scoring gymnasts advanced to the final on September 1.

References

Official Olympic Report
www.gymnasticsresults.com
www.gymn-forum.net

Men's parallel bars
Men's 1972
Men's events at the 1972 Summer Olympics